BD+20 274 b is an exoplanet that was discovered in 2012. It has an orbital period of 578 days and has a mass 4 times larger than that of Jupiter.

References 
https://arxiv.org/abs/1207.0488

https://exoplanets.nasa.gov/exoplanet-catalog/7077/bd20-274-b/

Exoplanets discovered in 2012
Exoplanets detected by radial velocity